Alena Dmitrievna Kanysheva (born 15 June 2005) is a retired Russian ice dancer who formerly competed in women's singles. As a single skater, she is the 2018 Junior Grand Prix Final bronze medalist, the 2018 JGP Armenia silver medalist, the 2018 JGP Austria silver medalist, and the 2018 Golden Bear of Zagreb champion.

She announced her retirement from women's singles and her intention to switch to ice dancing in 2019.

Career

Early career 

In November 2016, Kanysheva won the gold medal at novice level of the Tallinn Trophy ahead of You Young (South Korea).

2017–2018 season 

In January 2018, Kanysheva competed in the 2018 Russian Junior Championships. She placed 8th at the competition.

2018–2019 season: JGP Final bronze medalist 

In August 2018, Kanysheva debuted on the Junior Grand Prix (JGP) series in Linz, Austria. She was ranked 2nd in both the short program and the free skating and she won the silver medal behind Russian teammate Alena Kostornaia.

At her 2nd JGP event of the season, she won another silver medal, now in Yerevan, Armenia. She was ranked 2nd in the short program and the 3rd in the free skate. Kanysheva was about 33 points behind the gold medalist, her teammate Alexandra Trusova, but beat the bronze medalist, Yuhana Yokoi, by about 3.5 points. Both Kanysheva and her teammate Anna Tarusina won two silver medals during the JGP season. However, since Kanysheva accumulated more combined total points from her two JGP events than Tarusina, Kanysheva qualified for the 2018–19 Junior Grand Prix Final by a margin of 4 points.

At the JGP Final, Kanysheva won the bronze medal after placing 3rd in both the short program and the free skate. At this event she also scored her personal best score of 198.14 points.

In early February 2019 at the 2019 Russian Junior Championships, Kanysheva finished 11th.

In mid-February, Kanysheva represented Russia at the 1st Winter Children of Asia International Sports Games, winning the silver behind You Young and ahead of Ksenia Sinitsyna.

2019–2020 season: Injury and retirement from single skating 
Kanysheva was assigned to two Junior Grand Prix events, but was eventually replaced at both assignments due to injury.

On 28 January 2020, Kanysheva announced her retirement from single skating on her Instagram account, citing a back injury that made jumping too painful to continue. She stated her plan to continue her skating career in ice dance. It was announced on 8 June 2020 that she had begun training under coach Denis Samokhin and his wife, Maria Borovikova, assisted by 2019 World Junior silver medalist Nikita Nazarov. She was partnered with Andrei Pylin, but the team briefly split for a two-month period in early 2021, during which time Pylin teamed up with Anna Kolomenskaya. Kanysheva/Pylin reunited in late April 2021, and announced that they'd left Samokhin and Borovikova's team to train with Ksenia Rumyantseva and Ekaterina Volobueva.

End of skating career 
Kanysheva announced her retirement from competitive skating and her transition to coaching on 8 December 2021.

Programs

With Pylin

As a single skater

Competitive highlights 
JGP: Junior Grand Prix

With Pylin

As a single skater

Detailed results 

ISU Personal best highlighted in bold.

References

External links 
 
 

2005 births
Russian female single skaters
Russian female ice dancers
Living people
Figure skaters from Moscow